The Museum of the Revolution is a museum located in Algeria. The Museum displays a collection of memorabilia from Algeria's war of independence against France. It was established in 1968. The building was originally a village church.

See also 
 List of museums in Algeria

References 

History museums in Algeria
Museums in Algiers
Museum of the Revolution
Museums established in 1968